Leibnitzia (sunbonnets) is a genus of Asian and North American flowering plants in the family Asteraceae.

The genus is named for Gottfried Wilhelm von Leibniz (1646-1716), German scientist and mathematician

 Species
 Leibnitzia anandria (L.) Turcz.  - Japan, Korea, Manchuria, Mongolia, Siberia, Russian Far East
 Leibnitzia knorringiana (B.Fedtsch.) Pobed. - Kazakhstan, Kyrgyzstan, Uzbekistan
 Leibnitzia lyrata  (Sch.Bip.) G.L.Nesom - United States (Arizona, New Mexico), Mexico (from Chihuahua to Oaxaca)
 Leibnitzia occimadrensis G.L.Nesom - Sinaloa 
 Leibnitzia phanerogama Cass. - Siberia
 Leibnitzia pusilla (Wall. ex DC.) S.Gould ex Kitam. & Gould - Bhutan, Nepal, southwestern China

 formerly included
see Gerbera 
 Leibnitzia bonatiana (Beauverd) Kitam.- Gerbera bonatiana (Beauverd) Beauverd
 Leibnitzia nepalensis (Kunze) Kitam. - Gerbera kunzeana A.Br. & Asch.
 Leibnitzia ruficoma (Franch.) Kitam. - Gerbera ruficoma Franch.

References

 
Asteraceae genera